Lithuanian Social Democratic Union was a minor social democratic political party in Lithuania. The party had 6 representatives at the municipal level by 2011 and had no seats in either Seimas or EP. The leader of the party was Arvydas Akstinavičius.

In 2012 it participated in the Parliamentarian election having formed joint alliance with 2 euroskeptic nationalist parties, named "For Lithuania in Lithuania". The controversial symbol of this electoral union was a white sheep kicking a black sheep out of the logo. The alliance received 0.94% of votes.

By the end of 2014 party dissolved itself.

References

External links 
Official website, archived as for November 2004

Socialist parties in Lithuania